The 2011–12 season was Rotherham United's 87st season in their existence and the fourth consecutive season in League Two. Along with competing in League Two, the club also participated in the FA Cup, the League Cup and the Football League Trophy.

League table

Squad statistics

Appearances and goals

|-
|colspan="14"|Players played for Rotherham this season who have now left the club:

|-
|colspan="14"|Players played for Rotherham this season on loan who returned to their parent club:

|}

Top scorers

Disciplinary record

Results

Pre-Season Friendlies

League Two

FA Cup

League Cup

Football League Trophy

Managerial change

Following Rotherham's defeat to Oxford United on 17 March 2012, the club found themselves eight points from the play-off places in League Two. This prompted chairman Tony Stewart to sack Andy Scott two days later. Steve Evans was appointed as the new manager on a 3-year deal on 9 April.

Transfers

Awards

References 

2011–12
2011–12 Football League Two by team